John Anthony Flanagan is an Australian fantasy author best known for his medieval fantasy series, the Ranger's Apprentice series, and its sister series, the Brotherband Chronicles. Some of his other works include his Storm Peak duology, as well as the adult novel The Grey Raider.

Early life and careers 
John Flanagan was born in Sydney, Australia on 22 May 1944. He graduated from Waverley College with plans to become a writer. As he grew up, he changed careers and got a job at an advertising agency. He originally planned to become a trainee copywriter, but the agency instead assigned him to train as a media researcher. While working as a  media researcher trainee, he wrote an offensive poem directed toward one of his senior executives. Eventually, the poem made it to the desk of one of the company's directors. Flanagan was called into the director's office where he complimented Flanagan's writing skills and offered him the job of trainee copywriter. After working in the advertising agency for 20 years, Flanagan entered the TV industry and co-wrote a sitcom called Hey Dad..!.

Becoming a writer 
Flanagan's early novels originated mainly as thrillers. He started working on what would become the Ranger's Apprentice series in the 1990s. The series originated as twenty short stories for his twelve-year-old son, Michael.  Flanagan wanted to encourage his son to read and hoped that he could do so by convincing Michael that the stories were children's book ideas that his father wanted to test out. Also, since Michael was on the smaller side, Flanagan wanted to encourage him by showing that not all heroes must be big and strong. In fact, several characters in Flanagan's books are based on real-life people close to him.  Will, the main character in the series, was initially based on Michael.  Small, agile, and his love of climbing were all things that Michael and Will shared.  Evanlyn, one of the other main characters, was loosely based on Flanagan's daughter Kitty.  Finally, Halt, Will's older teacher, was also based on Flanagan's sixth-grade teacher.  His son fell in love with the series and began asking for more of the stories. In the early 2000s, John decided to make the stories into the first novel, The Ruins of Gorlan, and it was published in 2004. 11 books comprise the main Ranger's Apprentice series. He has also written the Ranger's Apprentice: The Early Years series which explores the time before the first book, and has continued the story in the Ranger's Apprentice: The Royal Ranger series. His other series in the same world, Brotherband, was based around Flanagan's passion and love of the sea.

Achievements 

 In 2008, he won the Australian Publishers Association's Book of the Year for "Older Children and the International Success Award" for Erak's Ransom.
 The series appeared on the New York Times Best Sellers List and regularly get shortlisted for children's book awards in Australia and overseas.
 The Ranger's Apprentice: The Ruins of Gorlan became optioned as a movie.
 Now sold to eighteen countries, the Ranger's Apprentice series has appeared on the New York Times Best Sellers List and is regularly shortlisted in children's book awards in Australia and overseas.

Bibliography

Ranger's Apprentice
 The Ruins of Gorlan (2004)
 The Burning Bridge (2005)
 The Icebound Land (2005)
 Oakleaf Bearers (2006) (The Battle for Skandia in the US)
Erak's Ransom (2007) (While released in 2007 this book happens before "The Sorcerer in the North" )
 The Sorcerer in the North (2006) (The Sorcerer of the North in the US)
 The Siege of Macindaw (2007)
 The Kings of Clonmel (2008)
 Halt's Peril (2009)
 The Emperor of Nihon-Ja (2010)
 The Lost Stories (2011)

Ranger's Apprentice: The Royal Ranger
 The Royal Ranger: A New Beginning (2013) 
 The Red Fox Clan (2018)
 Duel At Araluen (2019)
 The Missing Prince (2020)
 Escape from Falaise (2021)
 The Wolves of Arazan (2022)

Ranger's Apprentice: The Early Years
 The Tournament at Gorlan (2015)
 The Battle of Hackham Heath (2016)

Brotherband
 The Outcasts (2011)
 The Invaders (2012)
 The Hunters (2012)
 Slaves of Socorro (2014)
 Scorpion Mountain (2014)
 The Ghostfaces (2016)
 The Caldera (2017)
 Return of the Temujai (2019)
 The Stern Chase (2022)

Jesse Parker
 Storm Peak (2009)
 Avalanche Pass (2010)

Adult Novels
 The Grey Raider (2015)

References

External links

 
 Official Ranger's Apprentice Website
 John Flanagan at Penguin Random House

1944 births
21st-century Australian novelists
Australian fantasy writers
Australian male novelists
Australian screenwriters
Writers from Sydney
Living people
Australian male screenwriters
21st-century Australian male writers
21st-century Australian screenwriters